La Nuit des Traquées (English: The Night of the Hunted,  The Night of the Stalking) is a 1980 film directed by Jean Rollin, about people who have lost their memories in an environmental accident and are confined in a hospital.

Plot
On a cold dark night, a man is driving through the countryside and discovers a young woman who seems to be running from something.  The man stops and puts her in his car and does not notice another woman, who is completely naked, calling out for her.  The woman tells the man that her name is Elizabeth; she insists there are people after her but she seems to be confused and frightened.  He takes Elizabeth to his apartment in Paris and realizes she is incapable of remembering anything for any length of time.  He tells her his name is Robert, which she has trouble remembering a few minutes later.  She begs him not to leave her as she will forget him, and the pair make love, during which Robert tells Elizabeth to remember his face so she will never forget this time together.  The next morning Robert has to go to work and when he's gone, Dr. Francis breaks into his apartment to persuade Elizabeth to return to the clinic, where she escaped from, where people are being treated for memory loss.

On her return to the clinic, Elizabeth seems to remember the woman, the one who called out for her the night before, but they only remember each other's name, nothing more.  The two of them attempt another escape and manage to get in contact with Robert, as Elizabeth remembers him, but they are both recaptured.  Robert locates the clinic where he is told by Dr. Francis that the patients are suffering from a disease that slowly takes their memories away, and soon all the afflicted will become like the walking dead, but Robert refuses to believe this and is determined to rescue Elizabeth.

The doctors at the clinic begin to dispose of the people whose memories have gone completely.  Robert manages to find Elizabeth, but it is too late now that the disease has taken her completely.  Dr. Francis shoots Robert in the head and he becomes just like Elizabeth.  Unaware what is going on around them, Elizabeth and Robert walk side by side.

Cast
 Brigitte Lahaie as Elizabeth
 Vincent Gardère
 Dominique Journet as Véronique
 Bernard Papineau as Le Docteur Francis
 Rachel Mhas as Solange
 Catherine Greiner
 Nathalie Perrey as La Mère (credited as Natalie Perrey)
 Christian Farina
 Élodie Delage as Marie (credited as Véronique Délaissé)
 Cyril Val (credited as Alain Plumey)
 Jean Hérel as Jacques
 Jacques Gatteau as Pierre
 Dominique Saint-Clare
 Grégoire Cherlian as Le Gardien
 Jean Cherlian as L'homme de Main

References

External links
 
 
 

1980 films
1980 horror films
French horror films
Films directed by Jean Rollin
1980s French-language films
1980s French films